Marie Cathérine Sophie, Comtesse d'Agoult (née de Flavigny; 31 December 18055 March 1876), was a French romantic author and historian, known also by her pen name, Daniel Stern.

Life
Marie was born in Frankfurt am Main, Germany, with the full name of Marie Cathérine Sophie de Flavigny, the daughter of Alexandre Victor François, Vicomte de Flavigny (1770–1819), a footloose émigré French aristocrat, and his wife Maria Elisabeth Bethmann (1772–1847), a German banker's daughter. The young Marie spent her early years in Germany and completed her education in a French convent after the Bourbon Restoration.

She entered into an early marriage of convenience with Charles Louis Constant d'Agoult, Comte d'Agoult (1790–1875) on 16 May 1827, thereby becoming the Comtesse d'Agoult. They had two daughters, Louise (1828–1834) and Claire (1830–1912). Marie never divorced the count, even though she had left him for Franz Liszt.

From 1835 to 1839, she lived with composer and virtuoso pianist Franz Liszt, who was six years younger, and was then a rising concert star. She became close to Liszt's circle of friends, including Frédéric Chopin, who dedicated his 12 Études, Op. 25 to her (his earlier set of 12 Études, Op. 10 had been dedicated to Liszt). Liszt's "Die Lorelei", one of his very first pieces, based on text by Heinrich Heine, was also dedicated to her. 

From summer 1837 until autumn 1839 they travelled to Italy and Switzerland, staying successively in Bellagio, Milan, Venice, Lugano, Modena, Florence, Bologna and Rome. It was these travels that inspired the composer to write his cycle of piano collections entitled Années de pèlerinage.

D'Agoult had three children with Liszt; however, she and Liszt did not marry, maintaining their independent views and other differences while Liszt was busy composing and touring throughout Europe.

Her children with Liszt were:
 Blandine Rachel (1835–1862), who was the first wife of future French prime minister Émile Ollivier and died at the age of 26
 Francesca Gaetana Cosima (1837–1930), who first married pianist and conductor Hans von Bülow and then composer Richard Wagner
 Daniel (1839–1859), who was already a promising pianist and gifted scholar when he died of tuberculosis.

In 1876, she died in Paris, aged 70, and was buried in Division 54 of Père Lachaise Cemetery.

Works

Her first stories (Hervé, Julien, and Valentia), published 1841–1845
 Histoire de la révolution de 1848 (appearing from 1850 to 1853, in 3 volumes), her best known work published under the name Daniel Stern
 Nélida, a novel (1846)
 Lettres Républicaines in Esquisses morales et politiques (1849, collected articles)
 Trois journées de la vie de Marie Stuart (1856)
 Florence et Turin (1862)
 Histoire des commencements de la république aux Pays-Bas (1872)
A Catholic Mother Speaks to Her Children (1906, posthumously)
Mes souvenirs (1877, posthumously).
 Correspondence with Liszt

References

Additional sources 
Cronin, Vincent. Four Women in Pursuit of an Ideal. London: Collins, 1965; also published as The Romantic Way. Boston: Houghton Mifflin, 1966.
Stock-Morton, Phyllis. The life of Marie d'Agoult, alias Daniel Stern. Baltimore: Johns Hopkins University Press, 2000. .
Encyclopedia of 1848 Revolutions

External links

 
 
 

1805 births
1876 deaths
People from the Free City of Frankfurt
19th-century French nobility
French women novelists
19th-century German historians
German memoirists
Writers from Hesse
German people of French descent
German emigrants to France
Burials at Père Lachaise Cemetery
Franz Liszt
Pseudonymous women writers
German women novelists
French women memoirists
19th-century French novelists
19th-century French composers
19th-century French historians
19th-century French women writers
19th-century French memoirists
19th-century pseudonymous writers